Procymidone is a pesticide. It is often used for killing unwanted ferns and nettles, and as a dicarboximide fungicide for killing fungi, for example as seed dressing, pre-harvest spray or post-harvest dip of lupins, grapes, stone fruit, strawberries.  It is a known endocrine disruptor (androgen receptor antagonist) which interferes with the sexual differention of male rats.  It is considered to be a poison.

See also
 Phenothrin
 Prochloraz
 Vinclozolin

References

External links
 

Chlorobenzenes
Endocrine disruptors
Imides
Nonsteroidal antiandrogens
Pesticides